The Dunedin School of Medicine is the name of the School of Medicine that is based on the Dunedin campus of the University of Otago.  
All University of Otago medical students who gain entry after the competitive Health Sciences First Year program, or who gain graduate entry, spend their second and third years (ELM; Early Learning in Medicine) studying at the Otago Medical School in Dunedin. In their fourth, fifth, and sixth years (ALM; Advanced Learning in Medicine), students can either study at the Dunedin School of Medicine (Dunedin), the University of Otago, Christchurch, or the University of Otago, Wellington.

History
Opened in 1875, the Otago Medical School initially taught a two-year course with training completed overseas. 1887 saw the first medical graduate who had been taught solely at Otago. In 1891, the medical school was formally made the Faculty of Medicine. Until 1920, training took only four years, but was then extended to six.

From 1924, students could complete their last year of training at hospitals in either Auckland, Christchurch, or Wellington, as well as Dunedin. In 1938, branch faculties were established in these other centres. Otago's relationship with Auckland ceased after the opening of the University of Auckland School of Medicine in 1968. The branch faculties in Christchurch and Wellington became 'clinical' schools in 1973 and 1977 respectively; the forerunners to the modern University of Otago, Christchurch and University of Otago, Wellington.

Women graduates
Women did not enter medical training until 1891 when Emily Siedeberg became the first female medical student. Between 1896 and 1924 there were 50 women graduates; by 1949 200 women had graduated. Some of the women graduates between 1896 and 1929 were:
 1896: Emily Siedeberg
 1897: Margaret Cruickshank
 1900: Constance Frost, Daisy Platts-Mills, Alice Horsley
 1903: Eleanor Baker McLaglan
 1906: Ada Paterson
 1916: Doris Gordon
 1918: Marion King Bennie Cameron
 1921: Moana Gow, Eva Hill, Sylvia Chapman
 1922: Muriel Bell
 1923: Eily Elaine Gurr, Kathleen Todd
 1924: Mary Champtaloup
 1925: Cecily Pickerill, Helen Deem
 1926: Nina Muir, Theodora Hall
1929: Kathleen Pih–Chang

Dunedin School of Medicine
The Dunedin School of Medicine is one of eight faculties and schools within the Division of Health Sciences. The other faculties and schools within the University of Otago Division of Health Sciences are the Otago Medical School (home to the Otago Medical Programme and the Early Learning in Medicine programme); School of Biomedical Sciences; Faculty of Dentistry; School of Pharmacy; School of Physiotherapy; University of Otago, Christchurch; and University of Otago, Wellington.

Departments
The Dunedin School of Medicine is structured into eight academic departments: Bioethics, General Practice and Rural Health, Medicine, Pathology, Preventive and Social Medicine, Psychological Medicine, Surgical Sciences, and Women's and Children's Health. Most of these departments have a number of sub-sections or units. It also comprises and administrative department the Dean's Department.

Buildings
The bulk of the Dunedin Medical School is centred on a group of buildings to the southwest of the main University of Otago Campus, in an area including Dunedin Hospital and bounded by George Street, Hanover Street, Cumberland Street, and Frederick Street. These include the Hercus Building (Department of Pathology), the Adams Building (Department of Preventive and Social Medicine), and the Fraser Building (Department of Psychological Medicine). Other parts of the school are located within Dunedin Hospital, most notably the Colquhoun and Barnett lecture theatres, the Dean's Department, and the Departments of Medicine, Surgical Sciences, and Women's and Children's Health. The Department of General Practice and Rural Health is located at 55 Hanover Street. The Bioethics Centre is housed in 71 Frederick St.

Near the heart of the Dunedin School of Medicine, located alongside the Hercus and Adams buildings, are the Scott and Lindo Ferguson Buildings, both listed by Heritage New Zealand as Category II and Category I respectively. The Scott Building, built during the First World War by the architectural firm of Mason and Wales, is now used by the School of Biomedical Sciences. The imposing Lindo Ferguson Building is an Oamaru Stone and brick structure in classical styling built in 1927 to a design by Edmund Anscombe, also used by the School of Biomedical Sciences. It was named for Sir Lindo Ferguson, Dean of the Otago Medical School from 1914 to 1937.

References

External links
 Otago Medical School
 Structure of the University of Otago Division of Health Sciences

O, University of Otago Dunedin School of Medicine
University of Otago
Heritage New Zealand Category 1 historic places in Otago
Heritage New Zealand Category 2 historic places in Otago
Buildings and structures of the University of Otago